Peschany (masculine), Peschanaya (feminine), or Peschanoye (neuter) is the name of several rural localities in Russia.

Modern localities

Altai Krai
As of 2012, three rural localities in Altai Krai bear this name:
Peschany, Altai Krai, a settlement in Kuybyshevsky Selsoviet of Rubtsovsky District; 
Peschanoye, Smolensky District, Altai Krai (or Peschanaya), a selo in Linevsky Selsoviet of Smolensky District; 
Peschanoye, Topchikhinsky District, Altai Krai (or Peschanaya), a selo in Parfenovsky Selsoviet of Topchikhinsky District;

Astrakhan Oblast
As of 2012, one rural locality in Astrakhan Oblast bears this name:
Peschanoye, Astrakhan Oblast, a selo under the administrative jurisdiction of Liman Urban-Type Settlement in Limansky District;

Republic of Bashkortostan
As of 2012, one rural locality in the Republic of Bashkortostan bears this name:
Peschany, Republic of Bashkortostan, a village in Bulgakovsky Selsoviet of Ufimsky District;

Belgorod Oblast
As of 2012, two rural localities in Belgorod Oblast bear this name:
Peschanoye, Ivnyansky District, Belgorod Oblast, a selo in Ivnyansky District
Peschanoye, Korochansky District, Belgorod Oblast, a khutor in Korochansky District

Bryansk Oblast
As of 2012, one rural locality in Bryansk Oblast bears this name:
Peschany, Bryansk Oblast, a settlement in Klyukovensky Rural Administrative Okrug of Navlinsky District;

Chechen Republic
As of 2012, one rural locality in the Chechen Republic bears this name:
Peschanoye, Chechen Republic, a settlement in Burunskaya Rural Administration of Shelkovskoy District

Chelyabinsk Oblast
As of 2012, three rural localities in Chelyabinsk Oblast bear this name:
Peschany, Chelyabinsk Oblast, a settlement in Lugovskoy Selsoviet of Krasnoarmeysky District
Peschanoye, Troitsky District, Chelyabinsk Oblast, a selo in Peschansky Selsoviet of Troitsky District
Peschanoye, Uvelsky District, Chelyabinsk Oblast, a selo in Khutorsky Selsoviet of Uvelsky District

Republic of Crimea
As of 2012, one rural locality in Republic of Crimea bears this name:
Peschanoye, Republic of Crimea, a selo in Bakhchisaraysky District

Irkutsk Oblast
As of 2012, one rural locality in Irkutsk Oblast bears this name:
Peschanaya, Irkutsk Oblast, a settlement in Olkhonsky District

Jewish Autonomous Oblast
As of 2012, one rural locality in the Jewish Autonomous Oblast bears this name:
Peschanoye, Jewish Autonomous Oblast, a selo in Smidovichsky District

Kaliningrad Oblast
As of 2012, one rural locality in Kaliningrad Oblast bears this name:
Peschanoye, Kaliningrad Oblast, a settlement under the administrative jurisdiction of the town of oblast significance of Svetly

Republic of Kalmykia
As of 2012, one rural locality in the Republic of Kalmykia bears this name:
Peschany, Republic of Kalmykia, a settlement in Peschanaya Rural Administration of Priyutnensky District;

Republic of Karelia
As of 2012, one rural locality in the Republic of Karelia bears this name:
Peschanoye, Republic of Karelia, a village in Pudozhsky District

Khanty-Mansi Autonomous Okrug
As of 2012, one rural locality in Khanty-Mansi Autonomous Okrug bears this name:
Peschany, Khanty-Mansi Autonomous Okrug, a settlement in Surgutsky District

Krasnodar Krai
As of 2012, four rural localities in Krasnodar Krai bear this name:
Peschany, Anapsky District, Krasnodar Krai, a khutor in Primorsky Rural Okrug of Anapsky District; 
Peschany, Korenovsky District, Krasnodar Krai, a settlement in Novoberezansky Rural Okrug of Korenovsky District; 
Peschany, Seversky District, Krasnodar Krai, a khutor in Lvovsky Rural Okrug of Seversky District; 
Peschany, Tbilissky District, Krasnodar Krai, a khutor in Peschany Rural Okrug of Tbilissky District;

Kursk Oblast
As of 2012, one rural locality in Kursk Oblast bears this name:
Peschanoye, Kursk Oblast, a selo in Peschansky Selsoviet of Belovsky District

Mari El Republic
As of 2012, one rural locality in the Mari El Republic bears this name:
Peschany, Mari El Republic, a settlement in Kuyarsky Rural Okrug of Medvedevsky District;

Murmansk Oblast
As of 2012, one rural locality in Murmansk Oblast bears this name:
Peschany, Murmansk Oblast, an inhabited locality in Pushnovsky Territorial Okrug of Kolsky District;

Novgorod Oblast
As of 2012, one rural locality in Novgorod Oblast bears this name:
Peschanoye, Novgorod Oblast, a village in Rakomskoye Settlement of Novgorodsky District

Orenburg Oblast
As of 2012, one rural locality in Orenburg Oblast bears this name:
Peschanoye, Orenburg Oblast, a selo in Privolny Selsoviet of Ileksky District

Oryol Oblast
As of 2012, one rural locality in Oryol Oblast bears this name:
Peschany, Oryol Oblast, a settlement in Krasnoarmeysky Selsoviet of Sverdlovsky District;

Primorsky Krai
As of 2012, one rural locality in Primorsky Krai bears this name:
Peschanoye, Primorsky Krai, a selo in Mikhaylovsky District

Rostov Oblast
As of 2012, one rural locality in Rostov Oblast bears this name:
Peschany, Rostov Oblast, a khutor in Zadonskoye Rural Settlement of Azovsky District;

Saratov Oblast
As of 2012, two rural localities in Saratov Oblast bear this name:
Peschany, Saratov Oblast, a settlement in Kalininsky District
Peschanoye, Saratov Oblast, a selo in Rovensky District

Stavropol Krai
As of 2012, one rural locality in Stavropol Krai bears this name:
Peschany, Stavropol Krai, a settlement in Roshchinsky Selsoviet of Kursky District

Tambov Oblast
As of 2012, one rural locality in Tambov Oblast bears this name:
Peschanoye, Tambov Oblast, a selo in Rakhmaninsky Selsoviet of Petrovsky District

Tyumen Oblast
As of 2012, one rural locality in Tyumen Oblast bears this name:
Peschanoye, Tyumen Oblast, a village in Ognevsky Rural Okrug of Kazansky District

Volgograd Oblast
As of 2012, two rural localities in Volgograd Oblast bear this name:
Peschany, Bykovsky District, Volgograd Oblast, a settlement in Kislovsky Selsoviet of Bykovsky District
Peschany, Serafimovichsky District, Volgograd Oblast, a khutor in Peschanovsky Selsoviet of Serafimovichsky District

Voronezh Oblast
As of 2012, two rural localities in Voronezh Oblast bear this name:
Peschany, Olkhovatsky District, Voronezh Oblast, a khutor in Shaposhnikovskoye Rural Settlement of Olkhovatsky District
Peschany, Podgorensky District, Voronezh Oblast, a khutor in Skororybskoye Rural Settlement of Podgorensky District

Alternative names
Peschany, alternative name of Altn Bulg, a settlement in Sarpinskaya Rural Administration of Ketchenerovsky District in the Republic of Kalmykia; 
Peschanoye, alternative name of Yashkul, a settlement in Yashkulskaya Rural Administration of Yashkulsky District in the Republic of Kalmykia; 
Peschanaya, alternative name of Malopeschanka, a selo in Malopeschanskaya Rural Territory of Mariinsky District in Kemerovo Oblast; 
Peschanoye, alternative name of Peschanskoye, a selo in Peschansky Selsoviet of Shchuchansky District in Kurgan Oblast; 
Peschany, alternative name of Chernigovo-Peschany, a khutor in Pervomayskoye Rural Settlement of Kasharsky District in Rostov Oblast;

Notes